Édouard de Rothschild  may refer to:
 Édouard Alphonse de Rothschild (1868–1949), French banker
 Édouard Etienne de Rothschild (b. 1957), French financier & horseman